The common name nailwort may refer to several unrelated species:

 Any species of Paronychia (Whitlow-wort)
 Draba verna (Shadflower)
 Saxifraga tridactylites (Rue-leaved Saxifrage)